The following is a timeline of the Premiership of Alexander Mackenzie, who served as the second Prime Minister of Canada from November 7, 1873, to October 8, 1878.

1873
 November 8 – Winnipeg is incorporated.

1874
 January 22 – Mackenzie leads the Liberal Party to its first majority government in the 1874 Canadian federal election.
 March 26 – The 3rd Canadian Parliament enters session.
 May 29 – The Dominion Elections Act is passed, introducing the secret ballot and abolishing property qualifications.

1875
 April 8 – The Supreme and Exchequer Courts Act is passed, establishing the Supreme Court of Canada.
 June 1 – The Canadian Pacific Railway begins construction.

1876
 April 12 – The Indian Act is passed, defining many interactions between Indigenous Canadians and the Canadian Government.
 July 1 – The Intercolonial Railway is completed, connecting Central Canada to the Maritimes.
 October 7 – The District of Keewatin is created from the North-West Territories.

1877
 September 22 – Treaty 7 is signed between the Canadian Government and seven First Nations band governments.

1878
 September 17 – Mackenzie's Liberal Party is defeated in the 1878 Canadian federal election by John A. Macdonald's Conservative Party.

References 

Political timelines